Douglas is an unincorporated community in Center Township, Gibson County, Indiana.

History
The post office Douglas once contained was called Maxams. It operated from 1890 until 1904.

Geography

References

Unincorporated communities in Gibson County, Indiana
Unincorporated communities in Indiana